Chinchakhandi is a village in Bagalkot district in the southern state of Karnataka, India. It is located on the banks of the Ghataprabha river and between the towns of Lokapur and Mudhol.

References

Villages in Belagavi district